Alberto Bonacossa (24 August 1883 – 31 December 1953) was an Italian tennis player. He competed in the men's singles event at the 1920 Summer Olympics.

References

External links
 

1883 births
1953 deaths
Italian male tennis players
Olympic tennis players of Italy
Tennis players at the 1920 Summer Olympics
People from Vigevano
International Olympic Committee members
Sportspeople from the Province of Pavia